Clintwood High School (CHS) was one of three high schools in Dickenson County, Virginia, United States. It is located in Clintwood, the county seat of Dickenson County. It combined with [Haysi High School] in the 2015–2016 school year to form Ridgeview High School.

Athletics

Football
Clintwood won four state championships in football, three under legendary former head coach Ralph Cummins (1974, 1975, 1978). The fourth was won under former coach Rick Mullins, who played on the 1978 state title team, in 2011. Clintwood played at Ralph Cummins Stadium. Coach Cummins was the head coach of the Clintwood Football team for 35 years; his teams won 271 games, going undefeated in the regular season 10 times. Coach Cummins is a member of the VHSL Hall of Fame.

Basketball
The Clintwood Boys basketball team won two state championships, in 1950 and 1951.
The Clintwood Girls basketball team won three state championships, 1985, 1989, and 2015.

Notable alumni

 Justin Hamilton - Former professional football player, NFL, Cleveland Browns and Washington Redskins
 Shane Hensley - Novelist and owner of Pinnacle Entertainment Group
 Kevin Triplett - Vice President of Public Affairs for Bristol Motor Speedway; former candidate for US Congressman from Virginia's 9th Congressional District
 Loston Wallace -  Comic book illustrator
 Patrick Fleming - Musician, Assistant Director of Quality for Fortune 500 industrial contractor, Certified Welding Inspector

External links
Clintwood High School website

References

Public high schools in Virginia
Schools in Dickenson County, Virginia
1918 establishments in Virginia